Tina Grenville is a New Zealand actor, model, presenter and writer.

She attended Wellington Girls' College and moved into modelling becoming the 1964 Model of the Year. She also acted, in New Zealand and Australia. Her first husband went missing at sea when she was 20 years old. She was then married to Robert Bruning with whom she frequently collaborated.

She returned to New Zealand where she hosted a show Good Morning and was a panellist on Beauty and the Beast.

Select Credits
The Godfathers (1971–72) (TV series)
The People Next Door (1973) (TV series)
Is There Anybody There? (1976) (TV movie)
The Restless Years (1977–78) (TV series)

References

External links
Tina Grenville at New Zealand fashion museum
Tina Grenville at NZ on Screen
Tina Grenville at IMDb

New Zealand television actresses
Living people
Year of birth missing (living people)
New Zealand female models
New Zealand television presenters